The 1965 All-Ireland Minor Hurling Championship was the 35th staging of the All-Ireland Minor Hurling Championship since its establishment by the Gaelic Athletic Association in 1928.

Cork entered the championship as the defending champions, however, they were beaten by Limerick in the Munster semi-final.

On 5 September 1965 Dublin won the championship following a 4-10 to 2-7 defeat of Limerick in the All-Ireland final. This was their fourth All-Ireland title and their first in 11 championship seasons.

Results

All-Ireland Minor Hurling Championship

Semi-final

Final

Championship statistics

Miscellaneous

 Leitrim won the Connacht Championship for the first and only time in their history.
 The All-Ireland final between Dublin and Limerick was the first ever championship meeting the two teams.

External links
 All-Ireland Minor Hurling Championship: Roll Of Honour

Minor
All-Ireland Minor Hurling Championship